Swiss wing is a kind of sweet soy sauce-flavored chicken wings served in some restaurants in Hong Kong. It is marinated in sauce made up of soy sauce, sugar, Chinese wine, and spices. Despite the name "Swiss", it is unrelated to Switzerland. Instead, it is believed to have originated in either Hong Kong or Guangzhou.

Naming 
There are no concrete answers as to the source or the name of the dish. One story — likely to be a mere urban legend — goes that a Westerner came across the dish "sweetened soya sauce chicken wings" in a restaurant, and asked a Chinese waiter what that was. The waiter, who did not speak perfect English, introduced the dish as "sweet wing". The customer misheard "sweet" as "Swiss", and the name "Swiss wing" has been used ever since.

Origin 
Some claim that the dish was invented by a local restaurant, the Tai Ping Koon. It is a common practice in Hong Kong restaurants to name a new dish after a place, which may or may not have any connection with the dish itself at all.

Swiss wing is also featured in the TVB cooking variety series So Good.

See also 
Buffalo wing
List of chicken dishes
Soy sauce chicken

References

External links 
History of Tai Ping Koon Restaurant from their website.
Swiss Sauce Chicken Wings (Dark Soy Sauce Chicken Wings)
Hong Kong style Swiss sauce chicken wings 瑞士雞翼（Cantonese）at YouTube

Cantonese cuisine
Chinese chicken dishes
Hong Kong cuisine